Kenneth Gustave Wiman (October 1, 1930 – March 25, 2021) was a rear admiral in the United States Coast Guard.

Biography
Wiman was born on October 1, 1930 in Kearny, New Jersey. He graduated from Rensselaer Polytechnic Institute. He was married and has five children.

Career
Wiman graduated from the United States Coast Guard Academy in 1952.

Other assignments included being stationed in Ketchikan, Alaska, and Galveston, Texas. In 1981, he became Chief of Research and Development of the Coast Guard.

During his career, Wiman was awarded the Meritorious Service Medal three times. He retired in 1988.

References

1930 births
2021 deaths
People from Kearny, New Jersey
United States Coast Guard admirals
United States Coast Guard personnel of the Korean War
United States Coast Guard Academy alumni
Rensselaer Polytechnic Institute alumni
Burials at Arlington National Cemetery
Military personnel from New Jersey